Ronsecco (Ronsuch in Piedmontese) is a comune (municipality) in the Province of Vercelli in the Italian region Piedmont, located about  northeast of Turin and about  southwest of Vercelli.

Ronsecco borders the following municipalities: Bianzè, Crova, Desana, Lignana, Tricerro, Trino, and Tronzano Vercellese.

Demographic evolution

References

Cities and towns in Piedmont